Fagaronine is a benzophenanthridine alkaloid found in Zanthoxylum zanthoxyloides and other species in the genus Zanthoxylum.

References

External links 
 www.brenda-enzymes.org

Isoquinoline alkaloids
Quinoline alkaloids